Donnchadh Mac an Caoilfhiaclaigh was a 17th-century Irish poet. The poem Do frith, monuar an uain si ar Éirinn is attributed to him. Do frith links the disunity among Irish, which led to their defeat in the Irish Confederate Wars, with God's displeasure. Part of the poems states:

"Not this, I think, but God's revenge ... and not two of the group submitting one to the other, or yet to an individual who would be a support with whom to make a stand."

References

 Five Seventeenth Century Political Poems, C. O'Rahilly, Dublin, 1952 
 The Gaelic Mind and the Collapse of the Gaelic World, Michelle O Riordan, Cork University Press, 1990

See also

Cathal Buí Mac Giolla Ghunna
Peadar Ó Doirnín
Séamas Dall Mac Cuarta
Art Mac Cumhaigh
Seán Clárach Mac Domhnaill
Eoghan Rua Ó Súilleabháin

Irish-language poets
Irish poets
People of the Irish Confederate Wars
Irish Roman Catholic Confederates
17th-century Irish people